Bahram Ghasemi is an Iranian diplomat. He is a former Spokesperson for the Ministry of Foreign Affairs of Iran. He was ambassador of Iran to France from 2019 to 2021.

References

Iranian diplomats
Living people
1956 births